Death Threat is a hip-hop group who pioneered the gangsta rap subgenre in the Philippines.

History
Their self-titled debut album Death Threat went gold and produced the hit "Gusto Kong Bumaet (Pero 'Di Ko Magawa)" (in English: "I Want to Become Good (But I Cannot)") which told tales of the daily lives of the young impoverished Filipino youth growing up in the city streets and slum areas.

Their second album, Death Threat: Wanted became even bigger, passing the double platinum mark and producing the hit single "Ilibing ng Buhay (Ang Mga Sosyal)" (in English: "Bury (The Elitists) Alive") with Pooch of Ghetto Doggs.

Beware left the Philippines after the release of the album, and the group became the duo of Hi-Jakkk and Gloc-9, and released the third album Kings of da Undaground in 1997. The album received 4× Platinum Certificate Award despite of having no mainstream promotion and by only word of mouth in the streets. Beware then returned to the Philippines in 1998 to release the album Death Threat: The Return that was recorded in Sactown, California.

Gerald "Genezide" Acelajado became a born-again pastor.

Lawrence "O-Dogg" Panganiban was an RTC employee. In 2014, he was shot dead in Muntinlupa.

Discography

Albums
 1993: Death Threat
 1995: Death Threat: Wanted 1997: Kings of da Undaground 1998: Beware: The Return (O.G. Beware)
 1999: Reincarnation (compilation album)
 1999: Kasalanan (Genezide)
 2002: Still Wanted: Da 2nd Chapter 2005: Beware: Revenge of tha Undaground 2005: Da Best of Death Threat (1993-2003) 2014: The Best of Beware (2-disc album)
 N/A: Death Threat 8''

References

External links
Interview with Death Threat founding member Ron Salonga

Filipino rappers
Filipino hip hop groups
Musical groups established in 1993
Musical groups disestablished in 2003